(The) Complete (Short) Stories may refer to:

 The Complete Stories (Asimov), by Isaac Asimov
 The Complete Short Stories of J. G. Ballard (in two volumes)
 The Complete Short Stories of Ernest Hemingway
 The Complete Stories of Franz Kafka
 The Complete Stories (O'Connor), by Flannery O'Connor
 Dorothy Parker - Complete Stories
 Complete Stories (Vonnegut), by Kurt Vonnegut
 Complete Stories (magazine), a 1930s pulp magazine which published authors such as Robert E. Howard